The 2004 NCAA Division II football rankings are from the American Football Coaches Association (AFCA). This is for the 2004 season.

Legend

American Football Coaches Association poll

Notes

References

Rankings
NCAA Division II football rankings